Canteen Stores Department, Bangladesh (CSD) is a military-owned retail chain store in Bangladesh.  Owned and run by the Bangladesh Army, it provides a variety of food, electronics and other consumer goods. Army personnel are entitled to special discounts at all CSD outlets.

The popular local fast food chain Captain's World is also owned and run by the CSD. The first Captain's World opened in 2007 near Jahangir Gate of Dhaka Cantonment and a second branch opened in Uttara. The third branch of Captain's World was opened in 2011 in Dhanmondi. CSD also runs Captain's Bakery and Cinderella Shopping Mall.

In July 2020, retired Lieutenant General Chowdhury Hasan Sarwardy was banned from CSD outlets.

See also
Canteen Stores Department (India)
Canteen Stores Department (Pakistan)

References

Retail companies of Bangladesh